Manfred Richter (born 16 October 1929) is a German writer, scriptwriter and dramaturg.

Life and career 
Richter was born in Dresden in 1929 as the son of a tram conductor. He first worked as a miner for the Wismut company, studied acting in Dresden and Berlin and at the DEFA-Nachwuchsstudio in Potsdam-Babelsberg. Nevertheless, he later decided to become an art teacher and took his exams in Erfurt. There Richter also wrote his first work, the children's book Das Zauberfaß (The Magic Barrel), which made him known as a young author. Louis Fürnberg became aware of him and persuaded him to study at the German Institute for Literature in Leipzig, which he did. Furthermore, he completed specialist training as a scenarist at the Konrad Wolf Film University of Babelsberg.

Richter became a staff writer at the Deutsches Nationaltheater und Staatskapelle Weimar, later a dramaturge at the Landestheater in Dessau and finally a screenwriter at the DEFA Studio for Feature Films in Babelsberg. He wrote his first screenplay for the East German film production company in 1962 for and with : Als Martin 14 war (based on a story by Hans Schönrock). After the of the Sozialistische Einheitspartei Deutschlands, he was dismissed from DEFA in the mid-1960s due to cultural-political disagreements and in 1966 was punitively transferred to Filmfabrik Wolfen as artistic director of the Kulturhaus, where he worked until 1975. Since then, he has worked as a freelance writer, interrupted by a six-year stint as a screenwriter at DEFA (1984-1990).

Richter wrote a number of scripts for about a dozen cinema and television films as well as various plays.

Filmography 
 1964: 
 1973: Reife Kirschen
 1974: Der Untergang der Emma
 1976: Ein Wigwam für die Störche (TV)
 1982: Familienbande
 1982: Das große Abenteuer des Kaspar Schmeck (TV-Serie)
 1986: 
 1987: Interrogating the Witnesses
 1991: Die kriegerischen Abenteuer eines Friedfertigen (TV)

Books 
 1980: Das Ei in der Trompete. Ein Roman für Kinder, aber auch für Erwachsene, die noch wissen möchten, worauf es im Leben manchmal ankommt. Kinderbuchverlag Berlin
 1981: Der vertauschte Vati. Kinderbuchverlag Berlin (Die kleinen Trompeterbücher, Band 146)
 2000: Der Schickedietenheimer Turm. Children book with illustrations by Manfred Bofinger; beigelegte CD mit dem Text. Märkischer Verlag Wilhelmshorst, 
 2004: Legende Lövenix. Ein ungesicherter Bericht über die Liebe und anderes Merkwürdige im Leben des Gottfried Wilhelm Leibniz. Als E-Book: Edition digital, Godern 2012, 
 2005: Jakobs Augen. Tales. Märkischer Verlag Wilhelmshorst

Further reading 
 Betroffenheit war unsere Absicht – a conversation with scriptwriter Manfred Richter; Filmspiegel No. 10, 1987,

References

External links 
 
 

German screenwriters
German male screenwriters
20th-century German writers
1929 births
Living people
Writers from Dresden